Muthukulam Raghavan Pillai (1900–1979) was a Malayalam dramatist, poet, screen play writer and actor who was well known in the role of Ashaan in Kavyamela. He was born in 1900 in Muthukulam, a small village near Haripad in Alappuzha District, Kerala, India. Known as the Akshara Guru of Malayalam talkie films, he wrote the screenplay and dialogues of Balan, the first Malayalam talkie and Jeevithanauka, the first box office hit in the Malayalam film industry. He is also the author of about 55 dramas and dozens of film stories and screenplays. In 1968, he acted in Viruthan Shanku, the first full-length comedy in Malayalam cinema directed by P. Venu. He acted in around 150 Malayalam films and wrote Tataka Parinayam Kathakali. An award named Muthukulam Raghavan Pillai Puraskaram has been instituted by Muthukulam Raghavan Pillai Samraka Samithi in honour of him.

Filmography

 Rajayogam (1976)
 Kamam Krodham Moham (1975)
 Chief Guest (1975)
 Pulivalu  (1975)
 Babumon (1975) as Advocate
 Vandikkari (1974)
 Bhoomidevi Pushipiniyayi (1974)
 Thacholi Marumakan Chandu (1974) as Kanachira Kannappan
 Checkpost (1974)
 Swarga Puthri (1973) as Paulose
 Kaliyugam (1973)
Interview (1973) as Sekhara Pilla
 Masappadi Mathupilla (1973)
 Manushyaputhran  (1973) as Vaidyar
 Chukku (1973)
 Yamini (1973) as Chettiyar
 Ladies Hostel (1973) as Kunju
 Maya (1972)
 Punarjanmam (1972)
 Balya Prathigna (1972)
 Kandavarundo? (1972)
 Mayiladumkunnu (1972)
 Bobanum Moliyum (1971)
 YOugumullaval (1971)
 Anubhavangal Paalichakal(1971) as Kurup Sakhavu
 Oru Penninte Kadha (1971)
 Aranazhika Neram (1970) as Lona
 Lottery Ticket (1970)
 Ezhuthatha Kadha (1970)
 Vazhve Mayam (1970) as Panchayat member
 Saraswathi (1970)
 Vivahitha (1970)
 Nurse (1969)
 Sandhya (1969)
 Velliyazhcha (1969) Paramu Pilla
 Viplavakarikal (1968)
 Thokkukal Kadha Parayunnu (1968)
 Vidyarthi (1968)
 Vazhi Pizhacha Sandathi (1968)
 Viruthan Shanku (1968) as Forest Officer
 Lady Doctor (1967) as Mathai
 Sahadarmini (1967)
 Madatharuvi (1967)
 Karutharathrikal (1967)
 Ullathumathi (1967)
 Bhagyamudra (1967)
 Pavappettaval (1967) as Narayana Pilla
 Rowdy (1966)
 Kalyanarathriyil (1966)
 Kadamattathachan (1966)
 Sthanarthi Saramma (1966) as Antonychan
 Pinchuhridayam (1966)
 Kalipennu (1966)
 Kusruthikuttan (1966)
 Kayamkulam Kochunni (1966) as Achuthan Nair
 Archana (1966)
 Kavyamela (1965) as Ashaan
 Sarpakadu (1965)
 Kuppivala (1965) as Kittumman
 Porter Kunjali (1965) as Keshava Pilla
 Bhoomilyile Malakha (1965)
 Kalyana Photo (1964)
 Kudumbini (1964) as Kunju Kaniyar
 Kalayum Kaminiyum (1963)
 Kattumaina (1963)
 Swargarajayam (1962)
 Vidhi Thanna Vilakku (1962)
 Kannum Karalum (1962)
 Viyarpinte Vila (1962)
 Umminithanka (1961)
 Nairu Pidicha Pulivalu (1958) as Kuttappa Kurup
 Lilly (1958)
 Achanum Makanum (1957)
 Koodapirappu (1956)
 Kidappadam (1955)
 Avan Varunnu (1954)
 Avakashi (1954) as Manmadan
 Snehaseema (1954) as Thommi
 Sandehi (1954)
 Ponkathir (1953)
 Lokaneethi (1953)
 Athmasakhi (1952)
 Vanamala (1951)
 Navalokam (1951)
 Yachakan(1951)
 Jeevithanauka (1951)
 Nallathanka (1950)

References

External links
 
 Muthukulam Raghavan Pillai at MSI
  Web Profile
  News Report

1900 births
1979 deaths
Indian male dramatists and playwrights
Indian male screenwriters
Screenwriters from Kerala
Male actors from Kerala
Malayalam-language writers
Malayalam-language dramatists and playwrights
Malayalam screenwriters
Male actors in Malayalam cinema
Indian male film actors
People from Alappuzha district
20th-century Indian dramatists and playwrights
20th-century Indian male actors
20th-century Indian male writers
20th-century Indian screenwriters